Sara Casanova (born 24 June 1977 in Lodi) is an Italian politician.

She is a member of the right-wing populist party Lega Nord and she has served as Mayor of Lodi from 2017 to 2022.

See also
2017 Italian local elections
List of mayors of Lodi, Lombardy

References

External links
 

1977 births
Living people
Mayors of Lodi, Lombardy
Lega Nord politicians
Women mayors of places in Italy